NGC 1898 is a globular cluster in the constellation of Dorado at an approximate distance of 170,000 light-years. NGC 1898 is located in the Large Magellanic Cloud, a satellite galaxy of the Milky Way, and was for some time believed to be discovered by John Herschel in 1834; however recent research shows it was first observed by James Dunlop in 1826.

References

External links 
 

1898
Dorado (constellation)
Globular clusters
Large Magellanic Cloud